Kentucky Route 957 (KY 957) is an urban secondary state highway located entirely in Warren County in south-central Kentucky.

Major intersections

References

0957
0957